The Midlands Music Awards (MMAs) are an annual award ceremony, run by the Midlands Music Organization, where accolades are presented to members of Zimbabwe's music industry who come from the Midlands Province of Zimbabwe. Winners receive a statuette.  The event was established in June 2014. The ceremony is held in June every year and contenders are judged on performances made in the previous year. The show is held at the Midlands Hotel in the capital  of the province Gweru and broadcast on Zimbabwe Broadcasting Corporation  - Zbc TV. The ceremony features  live performances by some of the nominees.

Awards
MMAs grouped into a number of categories which are representative of Zimbabwe's varying popular musical genres. The award is made up of 60% from the panel of judges (adjudicators) and the other 40% comes from the public through voting platforms such as sms among others.

List of Midlands Music Awards Categories
 Best Male Artist
 Best Female Artist
 Newcomer of the Year
 Best Hip hop 
 Best Rnb and Soul music
 Best Gospel music 
 Best Sungura music
 Best Music Video of the Year
 Best Jazz music
 Best Afropop music
 Radio Dj/Personality of the Year
 Best Club Dj
 Best Traditional Group
 Best Dance Group
 Best House music
 Best Collaboration of the Year
 Best Reggae/Chigiyo music
 Best Producer of the Year
 Best Music Album of the Year
 Lifetime Achievement Award

Inaugural Midlands Music Awards (2014)
The Inaugural MMAs were held on 28 June 2014 in the capital of the province Gweru with the following awards issued:
 Best Dancehall - Legion
 Newcomer of the Year - Slykiezle
 Best Hip hop - L kat
 Best Rnb and Soul music Male - Goodchild
 Best Rnb and Soul music Female - Marcyjay 
 Best Gospel music - Trymo Mutodza
 Best Sungura music - Peter Moyo
 Best Music Video of the Year - Goodchild for Arikundinyepera
 Best Jazz music (Male) - Jazzy Jazz 
 Best Jazz music (Female) - Shingi Mangoma
 Radio Dj/Personality of the Year - Dj Chilli (Zimbabwe Broadcasting Corporation's - Power FM)
 Best Club Dj - Dj Stavo
 Best House music - Mr Khoax
 Best Collaboration of the Year - Tisanyadzise by L kat featuring Goodchild
 Best Reggae/Chigiyo music - Bantuman I 
 Best Producer of the Year - Prince Oskid Tapfuma
 Best Music Album of the Year - L kat for Goodlife 
 Lifetime Achievement Award - Tongai Moyo and Bob Nyabinde
 Best Promoter of the Year - Mavis Koslek Image Modelling Agency

2nd Annual Midlands Music Awards (2015)
The 2nd Annual MMAs were held on 29 June 2015 in the capital of the province Gweru with the following awards issued:
 Best Dancehall - Lewaz Skattah for Quarter 2 Twelve
 Newcomer of the Year - Nybal for True Gospel
 Best Hip hop - L kat for The Golden Episode - EP
 Best Rnb and Soul music - Valentyne for I'm Not Afraid
 Best Gospel music - Mathias Mhere for Glory to Glory
 Best Music Video of the Year - Ur Highness for Incompatible 
 Best Jazz music - Tasarina for Zvakarongeka
 Best Afropop music - Soul Afrika for Singles Collection
 Best Club Dj - Dj Brian and Dj Masty
 Best House music - Shingi Mangoma for Handikusiye
 Best Collaboration of the Year - Goodchild and Dj Neo for Nakuyewa
 Best Reggae/Chigiyo music - Joe Wailer for Beautiful Zimbabwe
 Best Producer of the Year - Prince Oskid Tapfuma
 Best Music Album of the Year - Mathias Mhere for Glory to Glory
 Lifetime Achievement Award - Ismael Petker of Mahogany Sounds

References

Zimbabwean music awards
Midlands Province
2014 music awards
2015 music awards